Sole Survivor is a 1984 American horror film written and directed by Thom Eberhardt, in his feature film debut.

Plot
TV commercial producer, Denise (Anita Skinner), emerges unscathed as the sole survivor of an airliner crash and feels as if she is  about to be caught by something. She flirts with the doctor, Brian (Kurt Johnson), at the hospital, who is convinced that she is  experiencing "survivor's syndrome" in which sole survivors experience guilt and either commit suicide or put themselves in dangerous situations. Denise also receives some ambiguous warnings from psychic ex-actress Carla (Caren Larkey) who predicted the crash. A series of strange sightings and encounters of zombie-like people escalates until it is apparent that something is trying to kill her as people around her start dying as well. Her skeptical boyfriend (Brian the doctor) thinks Denise is going crazy until he finds out that a number of recently dead people—including one that Denise claims attacked her—were found with all of the blood in their bodies drained into their legs as if they had died standing upright.

Plagued by night fears as well as a series of near-miss accidents that happen to her, Denise confides in her best friend and neighbor, Kristy (Robin Davidson), about what is happening, but Kristy, also, is skeptical. Denise becomes convinced that what is happening to her is supernatural in nature. Thinking that she was supposed to die in the air crash, Denise speculates that the specter of death is making people who have recently died come back to life and stalk her before finding an opportunity to kill her to finish what the chain of events that began with the plane crash started.

One rainy evening, when a man, a highway inspector who just died, breaks into Denise's house, he happens to find Kristy instead, whom he kills by drowning. Denise walks in and barely escapes and calls the police who take her in for questioning only to find the man that Denise identified as attacking her was found dead a short distance away and who had been dead for several hours. Also, Kristy's body is missing. When Brian talks with his pathologist friend Artie (William Snare) who tells him about irregular happenings in dead bodies (which include a little girl, a homeless man, as well as the health inspector that attempted to kill Denise) had lividity of their blood draining into their legs as if they had been walking around after death, Brian begins to suspect that Denise might be telling the truth.

Meanwhile, the zombie Kristy murders a taxi driver who stops for her, and both of them attempt to kill Denise the following evening in her house. Brian arrives with a gun to attempt to stop them or help Denise, but he too ends up getting stabbed and killed by the undead Kristy. Denise manages to escape from her house and drives through the nearby city which is deserted, but the car breaks down and she finds herself alone on the streets... aware that somewhere in a hospital or a morgue or a back alley that there is a person who has just died and will become a reanimated corpse for the sole purpose of killing her. The scared Denise manages to board a passing, late-night bus and arrives at Carla's house with Brian's gun where she confides in Carla about what is going on and asks for help. But Carla, who has not spoken a word since Denise arrived at her house, takes the gun, revealing herself to be an undead cadaver having committed suicide minutes earlier by slashing her wrists in a bathtub, and shoots Denise dead before going back to the bathtub.

The final scene has Artie at the morgue with the bodies of Denise, Brian, Carla, Kristy, and the taxi driver. Artie continues to be puzzled at how the blood in the bodies of the last three corpses drained into their legs. After talking to a skeptical police detective over the phone about the uncanny irregularities, Artie begins to finally suspect something strange is going on. In the final shot, as Artie begins to type out a report to document this, one of the bodies sits up on its gurney behind him. He turns his head as he somehow senses this, and then the screen goes black.

Cast
Anita Skinner as Denise Watson
Kurt Johnson as Brian Richardson
Robin Davidson as Kristy Cutler
Caren Larkey as Karla Davis
Andrew Boyer as Blake
Daniel Cartwell as Lt. Patterson
Wendy Dake as Roxie
Steven Isbell as the Cabbie
William Snare as Artie
Clay Wilcox as Randy
Brinke Stevens as Jennifer
Leon Robinson as the Gang Leader

Release
The film was given a limited release theatrically in the United States by International Film Marketing in March 1984.  Vestron Video released it on VHS in 1985.

The film was released on DVD in the United States by Code Red DVD in 2008.

Reception

Tristan Sinns of Dread Central rated it 4/5 stars and compared it positively to the Final Destination film series.  Tom Becker of DVD Verdict called it "a chilly and effective little creeper" that pre-dates Final Destination.  Writing in The Zombie Movie Encyclopedia, academic Peter Dendle called it "essentially a reworking of the classic Carnival of Souls" with zombies.
Erich Kuersten from Acidemic Journal of Film and Media awarded the film 3.5 out of 4 stars, commending the film's atmosphere, and characterizations; comparing the writer/director positively to John Carpenter.

Bill Gibron of DVD Talk rated it 2.5/5 stars and wrote that the film's slow pace causes it to be dull.
TV Guide awarded the film 1 out of 5 stars, calling it "dull".

References

External links
 
 
 
 

1984 films
1984 horror films
American psychological horror films
American supernatural horror films
American zombie films
Films directed by Thom Eberhardt
American erotic horror films
Erotic slasher films
1984 directorial debut films
1980s English-language films
1980s American films